Ithaca Bus Station, also referred to as Ithaca Bus Terminal, is an intercity bus station in Ithaca, the county seat and only city in Tompkins County, New York. The Prairie-style building, located west of North Fulton Street between West Seneca Street and West State Street, was designed by architect Frank J. Nies in 1912 as a train station of the Delaware, Lackawanna and Western Railroad. DL&W ceased passenger operations in 1942, and Greyhound Bus Lines acquired the station in 1967. The station building accommodates waiting area with seats, ticketing and package express office, and restrooms.
The station closed in October, 2018 due to construction, retirement of the station operators, and changing infrastructure in the area.  Buses are now boarding downtown for the time being until long-term plans are made. The City of Ithaca designated the station as a local landmark in January, 2019.

Bus lines
Ithaca Bus Station was served by the following intercity bus lines:
 Chenango Valley Bus Lines
 Greyhound Lines
 ShortLine Coach USA
 Trailways of New York

Bus routes
The station was on the Greyhound routes from New York City to Buffalo or Rochester daily, and from Syracuse to Elmira daily. It was also on the ShortLine route from New York or Binghamton to Cornell North Campus (CC Lot) daily, New York to Ithaca College (Park Communications Bldg.), and Albany to Cornell North Campus. The Greyhound routes operated by Trailways of New York were not available on the operator Trailways' official website.

Connecting transportation
The Route 14 (West Hill–Hospital–Commons) of Tompkins Consolidated Area Transit (TCAT) served Ithaca Bus Station at a curbside stop, bounding for Cayuga Medical Center daily, while the route also serves the bus station at State Street and Fulton Street, a curbside stop across State Street, for Green Street at Ithaca Commons daily.

TCAT Route 20 (Enfield–Commons) and 21 (Trumansburg–Commons) also serves the station at Seneca Street and Fulton Street, a curbside stop across Seneca Street, for Enfield Highway Department and Aubles Trailer Park in Trumansburg daily.

References

External links
 

Buildings and structures in Ithaca, New York
Bus stations in New York (state)
2018 disestablishments in New York (state)